Ignas Vaitkus (born 22 February 1993) is a Lithuanian professional basketball player for Pieno žvaigždės Pasvalys.

Playing career
Born in Šiauliai, Vaitkus started his professional career in Šiaulių Saulė-Aukštabalis. 
He moved to National Basketball league in 2012-13 season, when he signed with Meresta Pakruojis.

National team career 

Vaitkus won gold medal with the Lithuanian team during the 2017 Summer Universiade after defeating the United States' team 74–85 in the final.

References

1993 births
Living people
BC Juventus players
BC Nevėžis players
BC Šiauliai players
BC Šilutė basketball players
Lithuanian men's basketball players
Small forwards
Sportspeople from Šiauliai
Universiade gold medalists for Lithuania
Universiade medalists in basketball
Medalists at the 2017 Summer Universiade